Pralboino is a comune in the province of Brescia, in Lombardy. As of 2011 Pralboino had a population of 2,975.

Sources

Cities and towns in Lombardy